The Girua River is a river located in the Oro Province of Papua New Guinea.

Alluvial gold was discovered in the river late in the 19th century. By 1898, about 150 miners were working on the Gira and Mambare rivers.

References

Rivers of Papua New Guinea
Oro Province
Gold mines in Papua New Guinea